1423 Jose, provisional designation , is a stony asteroid of the Koronis family from the outer regions of the asteroid belt, approximately  in diameter. It was discovered on 28 August 1936, by Belgian astronomer Joseph Hunaerts at the Royal Observatory of Belgium in Uccle. The elongated S-type asteroid has a rotation period of 12.3 hours. It was named for Giuseppina, daughter of Italian astronomer Giuseppe Bianchi.

Orbit and classification 

Jose is a core member of the Koronis family, a prominent asteroid family with nearly co-planar ecliptical orbits. It orbits the Sun in the outer asteroid belt at a distance of 2.6–3.1 AU once every 4 years and 10 months (1,767 days; semi-major axis of 2.86 AU). Its orbit has an eccentricity of 0.08 and an inclination of 3° with respect to the ecliptic. The asteroid was first imaged on a precovery taken at the Lowell Observatory in June 1906. The body's observation arc begins with its official discovery observation at Uccle in August 1936.

Naming 

This minor planet was named by Cesare Lombardi after Giuseppina Bianchi, a daughter of Giuseppe Bianchi who died young. The official  was mentioned in The Names of the Minor Planets by Paul Herget in 1955. Lombardi published several studies on the orbit of this asteroid.

Physical characteristics 

In the SDSS-based taxonomy, as well as in the SMASS classification, Jose is a common, stony S-type asteroid, which is also the overall spectral type for the members of the Koronis family.

Rotation period and pole 

In November 2004, a rotational lightcurve of Jose was obtained from photometric observations by amateur astronomers Rui Goncalves  and Laurent Bernasconi  in Portugal and France, respectively. Lightcurve analysis gave a well-defined rotation period of  hours and a brightness variation of 0.68 magnitude, indicative of a non-spherical, elongated shape.

A modeled lightcurve derived from combined dense and sparse photometric data was published in 2013. It gave a concurring period of  hours and a spin axis at (78.0°, −82.0°) in ecliptic coordinates (λ, β).

Diameter and albedo 

According to the surveys carried out by the Infrared Astronomical Satellite IRAS and the NEOWISE mission of NASA's Wide-field Infrared Survey Explorer, Jose measures between 15.8 and 26.1 kilometers in diameter and its surface has an albedo between 0.16 and 0.34. The Collaborative Asteroid Lightcurve Link derives an albedo of 0.1151 and a diameter of 25.88 kilometers based on an absolute magnitude of 10.9.

References

External links 
 Asteroid Lightcurve Database (LCDB), query form (info )
 Dictionary of Minor Planet Names, Google books
 Asteroids and comets rotation curves, CdR – Observatoire de Genève, Raoul Behrend
 Discovery Circumstances: Numbered Minor Planets (1)-(5000) – Minor Planet Center
 
 

001423
Discoveries by Joseph Hunaerts
Named minor planets
001423
19360828